The Master of the Jewel Office was a position in the Royal Households of England, the Kingdom of Great Britain and the United Kingdom. The office holder was responsible for running the Jewel House, which houses the Crown Jewels. This role has, at various points in history, been called Master or Treasurer of the Jewel House, Master or Keeper of the Crown Jewels, Master or Keeper of the Regalia, and Keeper of the Jewel House. In 1967, the role was combined with Resident Governor of the Tower of London.

Incumbents

For subsequent appointments see Resident Governor of the Tower of London and Keeper of the Jewel House

References

Positions within the British Royal Household
Tower of London